Joan Vincent Murray (February 12, 1917 – January 4, 1942) was a Canadian American poet.

She studied at The New School, with W. H. Auden.

Her papers are at Smith College.

Awards
 1947 Yale Series of Younger Poets Competition, selected by W. H. Auden

Works

 Poems : 1917 - 1942 / Joan Murray. Ed. by Grant Code; with a foreword by W.H. Auden, New York : AMS Pr., 1971, 
 Drafts, fragments, and poems : the complete poetry, Farnoosh Fathi (Ed.), John Ashbery (Foreword) New York : New York Review Books 2017,

References

External links

20th-century American poets
American women poets
1917 births
1942 deaths
The New School alumni
British emigrants to Canada
20th-century Canadian poets
Canadian women poets
Writers from Ontario
Yale Younger Poets winners
20th-century Canadian women writers
20th-century American women writers
Canadian emigrants to the United States